A stile is a structure or opening that provides people passage over or through a boundary via steps, ladders, or narrow gaps. Stiles are often built in rural areas along footpaths, fences, walls, or hedges that enclose animals, allowing people to move freely.

Types

In the United Kingdom many stiles were built under legal compulsion (see Rights of way in the United Kingdom). Recent changes in UK government policy towards farming have encouraged upland landowners to make access more available to the public, and this has seen an increase in the number of stiles and an improvement in their overall condition. However stiles are deprecated and are increasingly being replaced by gates or kissing gates or, where the field is arable, the stile removed. Many legacy stiles remain, however, in a variety of forms (as is also the case in the US, where there is no standard). As well as having a variety of forms, stiles also sometimes include a 'dog latch' or 'dog gate' to the side of them, which can be lifted to enable a dog to get through (see pictures below).

An alternative form of stile is a squeeze stile, which is commonly used where footpaths cross dry stone walls in England. The gap must be narrow enough to prevent livestock getting through.

Gallery

See also

 Cattle grid
 Kissing gate
 Mass path
 Rambler gate
 Turnstile

References

Architectural elements
Types of gates
Landscape